Kaifa Records was an Ethiopian record label. It released 53 records between 1973 and 1977. Ali Abdella Kaifa, better known as Ali Tango, managed the company.

Singers who recorded for Kaifa included Alemayehu Eshete, Bizunesh Bekele, Mahmoud Ahmed and Hirut Bekele.

See also
 List of record labels
 Éthiopiques
 Amha Records

References 
 Falceto, Francis. Liner Notes. Éthiopiques Volume 7:  by Mahmoud Ahmed. Buda Musique 82980-2, 2000.

External links
 Kaifa Discography

Ethiopian record labels
Record labels established in 1973
Record labels disestablished in 1977